The First Union School is a historic Rosenwald school building for African-American children located at 1522 Old Mill Rd. in Crozier, Virginia.  It was built in 1926, as a two-teacher school.  It is a one-story frame school on a concrete foundation.  It has an engaged porch and hipped roof.  The listing included two contributing buildings.  The school operated until December 1958, when the county integrated its public schools.  It was converted to residential use in 1985.

It was listed on the National Register of Historic Places in 2009.

See also
Second Union School, also NRHP-listed

References

Rosenwald schools in Virginia
School buildings on the National Register of Historic Places in Virginia
School buildings completed in 1926
Buildings and structures in Goochland County, Virginia
Schools in Virginia
National Register of Historic Places in Goochland County, Virginia
1926 establishments in Virginia